Andrew Neeme is an American professional poker player and poker vlogger from Michigan, United States. He is known for popularizing the "meet-up game" in which he announces on social media where he plays and searches for other players interested in playing in the game. On January 3, 2022, Andrew Neme announced that he has become part owner of a card room in Austin, Texas, with fellow Vloggers Brad Owen and Doug Polk.

Early life
Neeme was born in Michigan and attended Michigan State University. With a telecommunication degree, Neeme initially intended to work in the cell phone industry. He worked with a London based company which involved the music industry. However, despite liking the music industry, he wasn’t satisfied with his salary. 

He found online poker at the start of the Moneymaker boom, in 2004, after moving to Los Angeles. He began playing on the now defunct poker site, Bugsy's Club and later switched his focus to live poker cash games, frequently making the trip from L.A to Las Vegas before deciding to move there for good and live his passion.

Poker 
His first result in a tournament dates back from 2010, when he came in 26th place in a $340 No Limit Hold’em tournament at the Venetian Deep Stack Extravaganza for $873.

Overall, his live tournaments winnings are quite modest, preferring live cash games. As of September 2020, Neeme had won a little over $90,000 in live tournament formats. He has only cashed in 5 World Series events for a combined mere $23,977. 

In October 2016, Neeme began a poker vlog which generated interest. By January 2019, he had garnered over 100,000 subscribers. He has often been credited with popularizing the "meetup game" where fans and viewers could play him in a live setting. He often plays with fellow poker vlogger, Brad Owen.

In March 2019, he temporarily partnered up with 888 Poker to provide live streams to his fans while he was playing poker in Alberta, Canada.

In 2021, after 12 years of professional poker, Hold'em player Andrew Neeme found a passion for Pot Limit Omaha, playing in Las Vegas. 

He has frequently appeared on Brad Owen's YouTube vlog.

References

External links
 
 Andrew Neeme Hendon Mob results
 Andrew Neeme Interview

American poker players
Living people
People from Michigan
Year of birth missing (living people)